David Skinner (born January 1946) is a Film and Theatre Producer.

Information 

David Skinner is owner/manager of ShadowCatcher Entertainment LLC which has been developing, producing and investing in Film and Theatre productions since 2003. Film Credits include Smoke Signals (Audience Award Winner, Sundance Film Festival; in 2018 the film was selected for preservation in the National Film Registry for being "culturally, historically, or aesthetically significant, and was enlisted in the National Library of Congress). Outsourced was adapted as an American sitcom television series for Universal Media Studios and NBC. Broadway productions include Moulin Rouge!, Ain't Too Proud, The Inheritance, The Ferryman, as well as Tony-winners Come From Away, Dear Evan Hansen, Memphis, Vanya, Sonia, Masha and Spike, and Gentleman’s Guide. 
Off-Broadway: Satchmo at the Waldorf, Buyer and Cellar, My Name is Asher Lev, and The Absolute Brightness of Leonard Pelkey.

Theater 

 The Inheritance (2019) (investor)
 Moulin Rouge! The Musical (2019) (investor)
 Ain't Too Proud (musical) (2019) (investor)
 The Cher Show (2018) (investor)
 The Ferryman (2018) (investor)
 Come from Away (2015) (investor)
 Dear Evan Hansen (2015) (investor)
 A Gentleman's Guide to Love and Murder (2013) (producer)
 Vanya and Sonia and Masha and Spike (2012) (investor)
 Memphis (2009) (investor)

Filmography 

 Keep On Keeping On (2014) (executive producer)
 A Not So Still Life (2010) (executive producer)
 Outsourced (2007) (executive producer)
 American Pastime (2007) (executive producer)
 Game 6 (2005) (executive producer)
 Getting to Know You (1999) (executive producer)
 The Book of Stars (1999) (executive producer)
 Smoke Signals (1998) (executive producer)

External links 

ShadowCatcher Entertainment
Smoke Signals at Amazon.com
Outsourced at Amazon.com

1946 births
American theatre managers and producers
Living people